Wratten is a surname. Notable people with the surname include:

Bill Wratten GBE, CB, AFC (born 1939), Air Officer Commanding-in-Chief of RAF Strike Command from 1994
Frederick Wratten (1840–1926), English inventor
Jack Wratten (1906–1996), Progressive Conservative party member of the Canadian House of Commons
Paul Wratten (born 1970), retired English footballer who played as a midfielder

See also
Wratten number, labeling system for optical filters, usually for photographic use comprising a number sometimes followed by a letter